Manitowaning/Manitoulin East Municipal Airport  is located  north of Manitowaning, Ontario, Canada.

The airport is classified as an airport of entry by Nav Canada and is staffed by the Canada Border Services Agency (CBSA) on a call-out basis from the Gore Bay-Manitoulin Airport. CBSA officers at this airport can handle general aviation aircraft only, with no more than 15 passengers.

The small terminal building has a food service and car rental office. Hangars and tie downs allow aircraft to remain at the airport.

The airport opened in 1988 and serves as an air ambulance transfer hub in the region to Toronto and Sudbury, thus is open year-round.

See also
 Manitowaning Water Aerodrome

References

Registered aerodromes in Ontario
Transport in Manitoulin District
Buildings and structures in Manitoulin District